Lyncombe is a district and electoral ward in Bath, Somerset, and a former parish in the Diocese of Bath and Wells. In the mid-19th century the parish was formed when the parish of Widcombe and Lyncombe was split in two, but it was abolished in the late 1960s. The village of Lyncombe existed since at least the Saxon period prior to becoming part of the City of Bath.

Lyncombe takes its name from the Celtic word cwm meaning valley, with the Lyn being the name of the stream that runs through it. The present day district is approximately centred on the Western part of this valley, known as Lyncombe Vale, and extends down to the more urban area around the River Avon across from Bath Spa railway station. The northern area of the electoral ward is known as Bear Flat.

The electoral ward was merged with Widcombe at the boundary changes effected at the elections held on 2 May 2019.

History
The Manor of Lyncombe was ecclesiastical property from the time of Osric, king of the Hwicce in the 7th century to the Norman Conquest. A charter of the City of Bath records that in 970 King Edgar "granted ten hides at Cliftune (i.e. Lyncombe), near Bath, Somerset, to St Peter's church, Bath, in return for 100 mancuses of gold and ten hides at Cumtune (possibly Chilcompton or Compton Dando, Somerset)."

The Domesday Book showed that in 1066 Sæweald Abbot of Bath, held 10 hides in Lyncombe. In 1086 this land was held by Ælfsige, his successor. Following the death of William the Conqueror the Burgh of Bath, including Lyncombe Manor was sold by his son, William Rufus to John of Tours, Bishop of Wells who moved the bishopric to Bath.

In 1302 the Priory of Bath obtained a licence for fairs on their manor of Lyncombe on the Feast of the Cross and on the feast of Saint Lawrence.

Lyncombe was part of the hundred of Bath Forum.

When Bath became popular as a spa town during the Georgian era, Lyncombe Vale was a famous beauty spot often visited by the well-to-do, and Jane Austen visited on one of her stays in the city. A mineral spring was discovered in Lyncombe Vale in 1737 by Mr Charles Milsom, a cooper (after whose son, Milsom Street in Bath was named). When attempting to fix a leaking fishpond he noticed a sulphurous odour, and saw water bubbling up from the ground. He then styled himself as a doctor and invited friends and neighbours to drink it. The following year a Dr Hillary wrote a treatise on the health-giving properties of the water, and the two men built a stone edifice over the spring to receive patients. However this weakened the ground and caused the spring to fail.

Lyncombe House, adjacent to the spa, was often called "King James's palace", a name derived from a tradition that James II of England stayed there with his consort Mary of Modena after abdicating the throne. Although this cannot be corroborated, it is known that Mary made a long visit to Bath in 1687, and later the king joined her at a time when the city would not have afforded them the privacy they sought in the face of great public discontent. Lyncombe, less than a mile from the city, would have been a likely refuge. The house remained a popular destination until the 19th century. A 1792 advertisement in the local newspaper proclaims of "A Publick Night, [at] King James's Palace, Illuminations, and far more Brilliant Fireworks that ever were exhibited in the Gardens".

During the industrial revolution the district of Lyncombe and Widcombe was noted for the manufacture of woollen cloth, with 565 males over the age of 20 being employed in the industry in 1831. The area closest to the river was considered the manufacturing part of Bath, whereas the valley of Lyncombe Vale to the south remained a more secluded area of natural beauty.

In 1835 the Municipal Corporations Act extended the boundary of the city of Bath to include the entire parish of Lyncombe and Widcombe. Twenty years later in 1855, and following an increase in the population of the area, Widcombe and Lyncombe were split into two parishes, with the church of St Mark's to become the parish church of Lyncombe, and St Matthews the parish church of Widcombe:

The boundaries of the new parish of Lyncombe were delineated thus by the Commissioners for Building New Churches:

In 1972 due to a declined population and attendances the parish of Lyncombe was abolished and incorporated into a new parish of Saint Bartholomew based in nearby Oldfield Park:

References

External links
Lyncombe Neighbourhood Statistics
Lyncombe police beat
7th-century establishments in England
Populated places established in the 7th century
Areas of Bath, Somerset
Electoral wards in Bath and North East Somerset
James II of England
Mary of Modena